Kennedy Simon (born 12 February 2000) is an American athlete who competes as a sprinter. She won a bronze medal in the mixed 4x400 metres relay at the 2022 World Athletics Championships, held in Eugene, Oregon.

Early life
From Atlanta, Georgia Simon attended Westlake High School before attending the University of Texas.

Career
Simon won on a bronze medal in the 2022 World Athletics Championships – Mixed 4 × 400 metres relay alongside Allyson Felix, Elija Godwin and Vernon Norwood.

References

2000 births
Living people
World Athletics Championships athletes for the United States
World Athletics Championships medalists
American female sprinters
21st-century American women